Johannes Meyer (28 May 1884 – 4 November 1972), was a Danish film actor.

He made his stage debut at the Dagmarteatret in Copenhagen in 1905 and went on to appear in more than 100 movies, making his first film playing the role of Erneste des Tressailles in Viggo Larsen's 'Revolutionsbryllup' at the Nordist Film Co in 1909. He was mostly seen in character or supporting roles in many talkies from 1933 until his last film appearance playing the role of Bilvis in Gabriel Axel's 'Hagbard and Signe' in 1967. He was also active on radio and in T.V. dramas and was stage director of the Fonixteatret and Norrebros Theatre before he was hired by the Royal Theatre in 1941. Died in Denmark in 1972, age 88.

Filmography 

 Du skal ære din hustru (Master of the House) – 1925 (directed by Carl Dreyer)
 De blaa drenge (The Blue Boys) – 1933
  – 1933
 Flight from the Millions – 1934
  (Lightning) – 1934
 Nøddebo Præstegård – 1934
  – 1934
  – 1935
  – 1935
  – 1936
 The Impossible Woman (1936)
 Inkognito – 1937
  – 1937
 Alarm – 1938
  – 1938
  – 1939
 Nordhavets mænd – 1939
 Skilsmissens børn – 1939
 I de gode gamle dage – 1940
 Jeg har elsket og levet – 1940
  – 1940
 Gå med mig hjem – 1941
  – 1941
 Tag til Rønneby kro – 1941
 Frøken Kirkemus – 1941
 Afsporet – 1942
  – 1942
 En pige uden lige – 1943
  – 1943
 Hans onsdagsveninde – 1943
  – 1943
 Teatertosset – 1944
 Besættelse – 1944
  – 1944
 ' – 1944
  – 1944
 Otte akkorder – 1944
  – 1945
 Mani – 1947
  – 1947
 Soldaten og Jenny – 1947
 Støt står den danske sømand – 1948
  – 1948
  – 1948
  – 1949
 De røde heste – 1950
  – 1950
 Café Paradis – 1950
 Mosekongen – 1950
 Dorte – 1951
 Fodboldpræsten – 1951
 Som sendt fra himlen – 1951
  – 1951
 Mød mig på Cassiopeia – 1951
 Det sande ansigt – 1951
 Frihed forpligter – 1951
 Vejrhanen – 1952
 Husmandstøsen – 1952
 Det store løb – 1952
  – 1952
 To minutter for sent – 1952
 Vi arme syndere – 1952
  – 1952
 This Is Life (1953)
 The Old Mill on Mols – 1953
 Hejrenæs – 1953
 We Who Go the Kitchen Route (1953)
 Min søn Peter – 1953
 Hendes store aften – 1954
  – 1954
  – 1954
  – 1955
 Blændværk – 1955
 Styrmand Karlsen – 1958
 Krudt og klunker – 1958
  – 1959
 Flemming og Kvik – 1960
  – 1961
  – 1961
 Det stod i avisen – 1962
  – 1963
 Hvis lille pige er du? – 1963
 Tine – 1964
 Døden kommer til middag – 1964
 Den røde kappe'' – 1967

References

External links 
 

1884 births
1972 deaths
20th-century Danish male actors
Best Supporting Actor Bodil Award winners
Danish male film actors
Danish male silent film actors
Danish male stage actors
People from Rudersdal Municipality